The Hot Potato Boys is a 1963 Australian television play.

Plot
The snobbish daughter of a naval captain becomes engaged to the son of a Commodore.

Cast
Kenric Hudson as Commodore Maybe
Kurt Ludescher
John Morgan
Noel Tovey as Sub Lt Godfrey Maybe
Mary Ward as Milicent Mayne
Julia Blake as Hong Kong Anna
Sydney Conabere
Peter Aanensen as Captain Culver
Roma Johnston as Sadie Culver
Deirdre O'Day as Joan Culver

Production
It was the ABC debut of Julia Blake who had recently moved from England to Australia.

References

External links
The Hot Potato Boys at National Film and Sound Archive
1963 British TV Version at IMDb

1960s Australian television plays
Australian television films
1963 television plays